São João de Meriti is a Brazilian municipality in the state of Rio de Janeiro. Its historical name is São João do Rio Meriti. Its population was 472,906 inhabitants in 2020. It's located in the region of Baixada Fluminense, having 34.996 km² (13.451 square miles).

The city is known as "Americas' Anthill", because its population density is one of the highest in the continent (13,185/km² or 34,815/sq mi).

History 

The place we know today as São João de Meriti, cut by the rivers Sarapuí, Meriti and Pavuna, was known before as Freguesia de Meriti. In the 17th and 18th centuries, Meriti had many farms and chapels, being an important producer of corn, cassava, beans and sugar.

In 1833, the São João de Meriti village incorporated the Maxabomba village, now City of Nova Iguaçú. In 1947, São João de Meriti was elevated to the status of municipality.

It is considered a commuter town.

It has some commercial centers such as its downtown, Vilar dos Teles (ex-capital of jeans), Coelho da Rocha, São Mateus and Shopping Grande Rio mall.

Many poor districts surround these commercial centers and others don't even have proper sanitation, like Jardim Paraíso, close to Vilar dos Teles. Some districts like Vila Rosali are populated by middle class.

Recently, the city has become an important cultural centre, being home to IPAHB and SESC. São João de Meriti is the hometown of the writer Lasana Lukata, volleyball player André Nascimento, actor Paulinho Gogó and the young André Mercury, nationally known for his performance on the Brazilian reality show Ídolos, when he sang his own song Casa da Colina (House on the Hill, in English), probably inspired by the homonym film. Meriti was also the hometown of João Cândido, the Black Admiral, one of the most prominent fighters in the defense of black people's rights. The footballer Bira was born here as well.

Territorial organization 
São João de Meriti is administratively divided into 21 bairros (neighborhoods) and 3 distritos (districts).

References

Municipalities in Rio de Janeiro (state)